Cham Khalaf-e Isa may refer to:
 Cham Khalaf-e Isa District
 Cham Khalaf-e Isa Rural District